Miss America 1940, the 14th Miss America pageant, was held at the Boardwalk Hall in Atlantic City, New Jersey for the first time since 1933. The finals were held on September 7, 1940. Aside from the winner, Frances Burke, Miss Philadelphia, two other contestants from Pennsylvania placed among the Top 15, one representing Eastern Pennsylvania and the other from Western Pennsylvania.

The runner-up, Rosemary LaPlanche, would become Miss America 1941, before the pageant instituted rules preventing contestants from competing more than once.

Results

Awards

Preliminary awards

Contestants

References

Secondary sources

External links
 Miss America official website

1940
1940 in the United States
1940 in New Jersey
September 1940 events
Events in Atlantic City, New Jersey